"Round Round" is a song performed by British girl group Sugababes. It was written by group members Keisha Buchanan, Mutya Buena, and Heidi Range, as well as Miranda Cooper, Brian Higgins, Tim Powell, Nick Coler, and Lisa Cowling. Produced by Kevin Bacon and Jonathan Quarmby, the song was released as the second single from the group's second studio album, Angels with Dirty Faces (2002).

Following its release on 12 August 2002, "Round Round" peaked at number one on the UK Singles Chart, becoming the group's second number-one single domestically. In August 2022, it was certified gold by the British Phonographic Industry (BPI). "Round Round" also reached the top 10 in Austria, Ireland, Italy, and New Zealand, among other countries. In 2003, it became the group's first single to chart in the United States, peaking at number seven on the Billboard Dance Singles Sales chart. Alongside "Sound of the Underground" by Girls Aloud, this song has been credited in reshaping British pop music for the 2000s.

Background
"Round Round" was written by Brian Higgins, Miranda Cooper, Lisa Cowling, Tim Powell, Nick Coler, Keisha Buchanan, Mutya Buena, and Heidi Range. Due to the inclusion of a sample from "Tango Forte" by German production team Dublex Inc., Florian Pflueger, Felix Stecher, Robin Hofmann, and Rino Spadavecchia are also credited as songwriters. In turn, "Tango Forte" is based around an uncredited sample from "Whatever Lola Wants" performed by American composer Les Baxter. Production on "Round Round" was helmed by Kevin Bacon and Jonathan Quarmby for Manna Productions based on an original track Higgins and Powell had created for Xenomania Records, while Jeremy Wheatley provided additional production and handled the mixing. Guitar recording and programming were overseen by Yoad Nevo for 247 Arists.

Musically, "Round Round" was actually built up of a number of different songs. On the BBC2 series Secrets of the Pop Song, Brian Higgins described the genesis of the song: "We had a drum track which was just stunning and so I sat down with Miranda [Cooper] on the one day we had the Sugababes in the studio and said 'Right, you know, this is a hit, this piece of music is a hit. I haven't got anything on it, we don't have any song attached to it. So what are we gonna do about that? You've got three hours to come up with something'." Subsequently, Cooper went through her catalogue of unused tracks that she had written over the last two or three years and sung the chorus of every single song against Higgins' piece of drumming. Three hours later, she sang the lyrics 'round round baby round round' to Higgins, who said "that's it, that's amazing."

Chart performance
"Round Round" debuted at number one on the UK Singles Chart and remained at the top spot for a week, giving the Sugababes their second consecutive UK number one single following "Freak like Me". The song was eventually certified silver by the British Phonographic Industry (BPI). As of August 2020, the song has sold 277,000 copies in the UK. "Round Round" was also a success worldwide, reaching number two in Ireland, the Netherlands and New Zealand. The song also reached number three in Denmark and number four in Norway, Romania, and Switzerland. In Australia, "Round Round" debuted at number 21 and rose to a peak of number 13, giving the group their first Australian top-20 hit. It was certified Gold by the Australian Recording Industry Association (ARIA), making it the Sugababes' best-selling Australian single up until the release of their 2005 single "Push the Button", which reached number three and was certified Platinum.

Music video

The music video for "Round Round" was directed by Phil Griffin. It has the group performing on a rotating platform, while being surrounded by a tornado with dust and rubble accumulating in it. There is a rusty caged wall with an audience watching, a pair of sunglasses and a ring get sucked into the tornado from them. When Heidi's verse comes up, everything moves in slow-motion, including the tornado, before speeding up again. The girls slowly walk around three male dancers in the middle, and for the end chorus it appears the tornado has dissipated.

Cover versions
The song was covered by Hong Kong singer Emme Wong in Cantonese in 2003. It was Wong's first single after her record label Universal Music modified her image for a sexier direction. The song quickly became a hit, due to its sexually explicit lyrics and dance moves, as well as the TV-banned video. The song reached the top of several music charts across Southeast China. In the year end, it won a number of awards, including "Best Covered Song", "Best Dance Record", and "Best Stage Performance".

Track listings

Notes
 denotes additional producer(s)
 denotes original producer(s)

Personnel
Personnel are adapted from the liner notes of Angels with Dirty Faces.

 Brian Higgins – writing
 Miranda Cooper – writing
 Lisa Cowling – writing
 Tim Powell – writing
 Nick Coler – writing
 Keisha Buchanan – writing
 Mutya Buena – writing
 Heidi Range – writing
 Florian Pflueger – writing
 Felix Stecher – writing
 Robin Hofmann – writing
 Rino Spadavecchia – writing
 Kevin Bacon – production
 Brian Higgins – original production
 Yoad Nevo – guitar, programming
 Tim Powell – original production
 Jonathan Quarmby – production
 Jeremy Wheatley – additional production, mixing

Charts

Weekly charts

Year-end charts

Certifications

Release history

References

2002 singles
2002 songs
Island Records singles
Number-one singles in Scotland
Song recordings produced by Jonathan Quarmby
Song recordings produced by Kevin Bacon (producer)
Songs written by Brian Higgins (producer)
Songs written by Heidi Range
Songs written by Keisha Buchanan
Songs written by Lisa Cowling
Songs written by Miranda Cooper
Songs written by Mutya Buena
Songs written by Nick Coler
Songs written by Tim Powell (producer)
Sugababes songs
UK Singles Chart number-one singles
Universal Records singles